Kedar is a rural Israeli settlement in the West Bank. Located to the south of Ma'ale Adumim and organised as a community settlement, it falls under the jurisdiction of Gush Etzion Regional Council.

The international community considers Israeli settlements in the West Bank illegal under international law, but the Israeli government disputes this.

History
According to ARIJ, Israel confiscated 45 dunums of land in 1984 from the Palestinian village of as-Sawahira ash-Sharqiya in order to construct Kedar.

The council was established in 1984 by families linked to the Betar movement. The name is taken from Song of Songs (1:5): "Dark am I, o daughters of Jerusalem, dark like the tents of Kedar"

References

Populated places established in 1984
Gush Etzion Regional Council
1984 establishments in the Palestinian territories
Community settlements
Israeli settlements in the West Bank